Evolve 131, also known as Evolve's 10th Anniversary Celebration, was a professional wrestling livestreaming event produced by the American promotion Evolve in partnership with WWE. The event aired on the WWE Network, making it the first Evolve show and the first independent wrestling show to broadcast live on the platform. It took place on July 13, 2019, at the 2300 Arena in Philadelphia, Pennsylvania. The show featured current Evolve wrestlers and alumni, as well as wrestlers from WWE's NXT and 205 Live brand divisions.

Production

Background
In October 2008, Gabe Sapolsky, long-time booker of Ring of Honor, was released from the promotion. In 2009, Sapolsky founded Dragon Gate USA, with the group holding its inaugural event on July 25 of that year. The following year, Sapolsky founded Dragon Gate USA's sister group, Evolve. 

In 2015, WWE entered into a partnership with Evolve, with the smaller promotion being used as a scouting group for WWE's developmental brands. In 2017, WWE began exploring deals that would see content from independent wrestling promotions (such as Progress and ICW) air on their WWE Network streaming service.

Over two years later, WWE announced that Evolve's 10th Anniversary Celebration, an event celebrating the 10th anniversary of Dragon Gate USA's founding, would air live on the WWE Network on July 13, 2019, broadcasting from the 2300 Arena in Philadelphia, Pennsylvania. This marked the first Evolve event and the first independent wrestling event to air on the WWE Network.

Storylines
The card composed of matches resulting from scripted storylines, where wrestlers portrayed villains, heroes, or less distinguishable characters in scripted events that built tension and culminate in a wrestling match or series of matches, with results predetermined by WWE's writers on the NXT and 205 Live brands. Storylines were produced on WWE's weekly television programs, NXT and 205 Live, and on Evolve events.

On June 26, it was announced that Adam Cole would defend the NXT Championship against Akira Tozawa, a wrestler dubbed the "Dragon Gate USA MVP" by WWNLive.com. It was also announced on June 26 that WWE Cruiserweight Champion Drew Gulak would face former Evolve Champion and current NXT wrestler Matt Riddle in a non-title match. The two wrestlers had previously been a part of the Catch Point stable during their tenures in Evolve.

On July 2, it was announced that JD Drake would face Austin Theory in a Winner Takes All match for both the WWN and Evolve Championships. Additionally it was announced that Eddie Kingston and Joe Gacy would defend the Evolve Tag Team Championship against A. R. Fox and Leon Ruff.

Results

See also
 List of Evolve Wrestling events

References

External links
Evolve's 10th Anniversary Celebration Official Website

2019 WWE Network events
2019 in Pennsylvania
Events in Philadelphia
July 2019 events in the United States
Professional wrestling in Philadelphia
Evolve (professional wrestling)